Hermann Mucke may refer to:

 Hermann Mucke (bioscientist) (born 1955), Austrian bioscientist
 Hermann Mucke (astronomer) (1935–2019), Austrian astronomer